Přáslavice is a municipality and village in Olomouc District in the Olomouc Region of the Czech Republic. It has about 1,400 inhabitants.

Administrative parts
The village of Kocourovec is an administrative part of Přáslavice.

References

Villages in Olomouc District